New Hampshire elected its members March 13, 1827, after the term began but before the new Congress convened.

See also 
 1826 and 1827 United States House of Representatives elections
 List of United States representatives from New Hampshire

1827
New Hampshire
United States House of Representatives